Party of Shariy (PSh) is a banned political party in Ukraine founded by political blogger Anatoly Shariy. Its official proclaimed ideology is libertarianism.

On March 22, 2022, during the 2022 Russian invasion of Ukraine, the National Security and Defense Council of Ukraine decided to suspend the Party of Shariy because of its alleged ties with Russia. An Administrative Court of Appeal banned the party on 16 June 2022. This decision was open to appeal at the Supreme Court of Ukraine. On 6 September 2022 the Supreme Court rejected the appeal of Party of Shariy and thus finally banned its activities in Ukraine.

History
In the beginning of June 2019, Anatoly Shariy - a Ukrainian blogger famous for his criticism of the Ukrainian media and government - recorded a video in which he announced the establishment of his own political party. Soon he published a video splash screen on his pages in social networks, in which he throws a red balloon towards the audience. Shariy did not explain what this means, but on his website there was a message that it was a hint of creating a party. Later on, the red balloon became a symbol of the party and its pre-election campaign.

The party was created by a renaming of the existing political party United Ukraine. United Ukraine had been registered in February 2015. On June 6, 2019, Party of Shariy was officially registered in Ukraine. The party took part in the 2019 Ukrainian parliamentary election. The namesake leader of the party, Shariy, as the candidate for the parliamentary election himself was denied registration by the Central Election Commission of Ukraine on the grounds that he did not meet the requirement of a term of five-year residence in the country immediately preceding the elections.

Previously, Shariy was known primarily for his investigations on corruption in the police and other law enforcement agencies during the Yanukovych government and, subsequently, sought asylum in the European Union in 2012 due to libel, defamation, and alleged politically motivated persecution by Ukrainian law enforcement bodies of the time. However, the party was officially registered by the Central Election Commission of Ukraine and entered into the election ballot under number 17, immediately following the Radical Party and preceding political party Holos on the list. On July 2, 2019, Anatoly Shariy was registered as a candidate for parliamentary election 2019 by the Central Election Commission of Ukraine. On the next day, July 3, 2019, the decision was reverted.

2019 parliamentary election performance
In the 2019 parliamentary election the party gained 327,152 votes (2.23% of total, position #10). Falling under the 5% threshold, it won no parliamentary seats. The party also failed to win a constituency seat.

Winning more than the threshold of 2%, it was originally subject to funding from the budget for its support. However, on 2 October 2019, the Verkhovna Rada adopted the draft law No. 1029, which deprived parties of state funding that had won less than 5 per cent of the vote. After the adoption of this law, Party of Shariy lost about 441,511 thousand euros of state funding.

On July 21, 2019 the party got 2.23% (almost 330 thousand voters) and failed to pass the threshold of 5%. The highest result it achieved in the east and south of Ukraine (5.55% in Donetsk and 4.72% in Odessa regions).

The political party of blogger Anatoly Shariy, was included in the top five political forces, which won the leadership in the extraordinary parliamentary elections in 2019 in Ukraine's foreign constituency. "The Party of Shariy" took fourth place in the electoral district abroad with 4.72% of the voters.

After the elections in 2019 
On 4 July 2019, Anatoly Shariy said in his video that his party was going into opposition to the pro-presidential party "Servant of the People" because Volodymyr Zelensky failed to meet expectations.

Regional elections 2020 in Ukraine 
Together with the Opposition Bloc, the Party of Shariy was considered a competitor to the pro-Russian Opposition Platform — For Life in the 2020 Ukrainian local elections. However, the leader of the Opposition Platform — For Life, Viktor Medvedchuk declared that he does not view the Party of Shariy as a competitor, but as allies.

The party won 52 seats in local councils. In east and south Ukraine.

2022 Russian invasion of Ukraine/banning of the party
On February 15, 2022, in the run-up to Russia's 2022 invasion of Ukraine, the local deputy of the Party of Shariy in Odessa spoke out against support for territorial self-defense units, calling them "bandits." She remarked that Russian military exercises had already ended.

On 22 March 2022 Party of Shariy was one of several political parties suspended by the National Security and Defense Council of Ukraine during the 2022 Russian invasion of Ukraine, along with Derzhava, Left Opposition, Nashi, Opposition Bloc, Opposition Platform — For Life, Progressive Socialist Party of Ukraine, Socialist Party of Ukraine, Union of Left Forces, and the Volodymyr Saldo Bloc.

The party's faction in Kharkiv City Council was disbanded due to lack of members.

On 16 June 2022 the Eighth Administrative Court of Appeal banned the party. The property of the party and all its branches were transferred to the state. The decision was open to appeal at the Supreme Court of Ukraine. (Of all the  parties suspended on 20 March 2022 only the Progressive Socialist Party of Ukraine and Opposition Platform — For Life actively opposed its banning.)

At its meeting of 6 September 2022 the Supreme Court rejected the appeal of Party of Shariy and thus finally banned its activities in Ukraine. The reasons for banning the party were cited: destabilization of the social and political situation in Ukraine, spread of anti-Ukrainian propaganda regarding the change of the constitutional system by violent means, violation of the sovereignty and territorial integrity of Ukraine, propaganda of war, violence in conditions of military aggression of the Russian Federation.

Party members 
Apart from the leader of namesake party Anatoly Shariy, the top-10 of the Party list during the 2019 Ukrainian parliamentary election included:
 Olha Shariy (Bondarenko) - Ukrainian journalist and blogger
 Pavlo Ullakh - journalist and historian, Ph.D. in World History
 Yevgeniy Yevtukhov (aka DJ Sender) - Ukrainian DJ, music producer, songwriter and singer; the owner of Send Records and its sublabels; the founder of the DJFM radio station
 Ivan Mamchur - businessperson, expert in online-marketing and online education 
 Artur Talabira - journalist and reporter; theatre and movie actor
 Mykola Gladenky - political science specialist
 Dmytro Butenko - IT-entrepreneur
 Roman Katerinchuk - IT-entrepreneur

Antonina Beloglazova was the third number in the party list until 2019. Antonina Beloglazova lost her position in the "Shariy Party" due to the scandal of 2015-2016. According to the media, she cooperated with Russia and the Russian National Liberation Movement, which is known for its presence at pro-Putin demonstrations. As soon as this information became available - Anatolij Shariy ended his cooperation with Antonina Beloglazova.

The party's political council consists of two people - it is headed by Olha Shariy and the other member is her first deputy Oleksandr Vyunyk. According to the Unified State Register, in June 2020 the party had 16 regional and 1 city (Kyiv) local branches.

Scandals

Relations with Russian ultra-nationalists and anti-government coups 

Antonina Beloglazova, the second person in his party and editor of the Shariy website, collaborated in Russia in 2015–2016 with the National Liberation Movement (NCD), which aims to "restorate of Russia's sovereignty". This movement has been repeatedly observed at various pro-Putin events.

Konstantin Mamrosenko, Beloglazova's brother, who heads department "B" in the "Shariy Party", together with "Motorola" took part in the seizure of the Kharkiv Regional State Administration during the so-called "Russian Spring" in 2014.

Tarasy Plaksiy, the curator of the Shariy party in Khmelnytsky, Chernivtsi and Ternopil regions, was at the Alabino military training ground in the Russian Federation in 2017, where Russian special forces are stationed, and took part in the patriotic event "Fight for Russia Day".

Threats and attacks

On supporters and party members
The supporters and members of the Party of Shariy were repeatedly attacked, using physical force, a mobile phone was also broken in one of these attacks, and soon one of the attackers was identified: a certain Konstiantyn Ustyuzhin, a citizen of Ukraine. In connection with this, a statement about the attack was written and then sent to the National Police of Ukraine for further investigation. After the " Mute President - Not My President" action, a wave of attacks on supporters of the "Party of Shariy" began.

Thus, on June 24 in Kharkiv, a supporter of the " Party of Shariy" - Nikita Rozhenko was beaten. Criminal proceedings on the attack on Nikita Rozhenko, coordinator of the "Party of Shariy" in Kharkiv, are being investigated as an attempt on murder committed by prior conspiracy of a group of people.

This has been followed by regular violent actions against supporters of the "Shariy Party". In Vinnitsa, Mykolaiv, Kharkiv, Kyiv, Zhytomyr, Cherkasy. Many of the supporters had broken ribs.

A "safari" in the Party members was openly announced by the National Corps.

"The mute president is not my president" protest

On 17 June 2020, by the initiative of the Leader of the political party "Sharij Party" Anatoliy Sharij, a peaceful demonstration was organized in Kyiv against the inactivity of President of Ukraine Volodymyr Zelenskyy, the Ministry of Internal Affairs of Ukraine and the law enforcement system as a whole on the protection of constitutional rights and freedoms of citizens.

In total about 2 thousand people came out to the action. Participants of the action shouted out: "Don't be afraid of people, be afraid of the law", "Vova - come out", " Mute President is not my President", "Why did you go to the Presidents?". However, after the demonstration there was a fight between party supporters and nationalists.

About party opponents

According to the journalist Andriy Kachor - he received threats from Sharij Party supporters after the publication on his site about the burning of Sharij Party agitation materials by unknown Vinnytsia people.

The police of Vinnytsia region identified the attacker on the chief editor of the local newspaper Andrey Kachor and found no connection between the attack and Kachor's conflict with video blogger Anatoliy Shariy.

"The police said they had found the man who had beaten Kachor. The attacker was a 27-year-old resident of Vinnitsa.
 According to him, there was a verbal altercation between him and Kachor in the cafe, which turned into a fight. The man denies any relation with the video blogger Anatolia Shariy, and calls the conflict situational."

Controversies
The party is accused of russophilia. The leader, Anatoly Shariy, strongly denies the allegations.

References

External links

Official profile of Party of Shariy at VK

2019 establishments in Ukraine
Banned political parties in Ukraine
Direct democracy parties
E-democracy
Eurosceptic parties in Ukraine
Liberal parties in Ukraine
Libertarian parties
Political parties established in 2019
Political parties disestablished in 2022
Political parties in Ukraine
Russian political parties in Ukraine